Magnus Svensson (born 1 March 1963) is a Swedish former professional ice hockey player. He won a gold medal with Team Sweden at the 1994 Winter Olympics. He also played 46 games in the National Hockey League with the Florida Panthers.

Career statistics

Regular season and playoffs

International

References

External links

1963 births
Calgary Flames draft picks
Florida Panthers players
HC Davos players
Ice hockey players at the 1994 Winter Olympics
Leksands IF players
Living people
Medalists at the 1994 Winter Olympics
Olympic gold medalists for Sweden
Olympic ice hockey players of Sweden
Olympic medalists in ice hockey
People from Tranås Municipality
Swedish expatriate ice hockey players in the United States
Swedish ice hockey defencemen
Sportspeople from Jönköping County
Expatriate ice hockey players in Switzerland
Swedish expatriate sportspeople in Switzerland